Pheia mathona is a moth in the subfamily Arctiinae. It was described by Paul Dognin in 1891. It is found in Ecuador.

References

Natural History Museum Lepidoptera generic names catalog

mathona